Tamayama may refer to:

Tamayama, Iwate, a former village located in Iwate District, Iwate, Japan
Tamayama Formation, a Mesozoic geologic formation

People with the surname
Tetsuji Tamayama (born 1980), Japanese actor

Japanese-language surnames